Gebrüder Kähler was a German fishing trawler that was requistioned by the Kriegsmarine in the Second World War for use as a Vorpostenboot. She struck a mine and sank in the Westerschelde on 5 September 1940.

Description
The engine was built by H. C. Stülcken Sohn, Hamburg. It was rated at 154nhp and drove a single screw propeller via a low pressure turbine, double reduction gearing and a hydraulic coupling.

History
Gebrüder Kähler was built as yard number 722 by H. C. Stülcken Sohn, Hamburg. She was launched on 20 October 1937 and completed in December. She was built for Hinrich Foch Hochseefischerei AG, Hamburg. The Code Letters DJVD were allocated, as was the fishing boat registration HH 234.

On 24 September 1939, Gebrüder Kähler was requisitioned by the Kriegsmarine for use as a Vorpostenboot. She was allocated to 2 Vorpostenflotille as V 208 Gebrüder Kähler. On 20 October, she was redesignated as V 201 Gebrüder Kähler. On 5 September 1940, she struck a mine and sank in the Westerschelde.

References

Sources

1937 ships
Fishing vessels of Germany
Steamships of Germany
Auxiliary ships of the Kriegsmarine
Maritime incidents in September 1940